Giuliana Chenal-Minuzzo (née Minuzzo, 26 November 1931 – 11 November 2020) was an Italian alpine skier.

Career
She was born in Vallonara di Marostica. At the 1952 Olympics in Oslo Minuzzo was the bronze medalist in the women's downhill competition. At the 1960 Olympics in Squaw Valley she was bronze medalist in the women's giant slalom event.

At the 1956 Winter Olympics in Cortina d'Ampezzo, Minuzzo made history by becoming the first woman to take the Olympic Oath.

On 11 November 2020, Minuzzo died at the age of 88.

References

External links
 

1931 births
2020 deaths
Italian female alpine skiers
Olympic alpine skiers of Italy
Olympic bronze medalists for Italy
Olympic medalists in alpine skiing
Medalists at the 1952 Winter Olympics
Medalists at the 1960 Winter Olympics
Alpine skiers at the 1952 Winter Olympics
Alpine skiers at the 1956 Winter Olympics
Alpine skiers at the 1960 Winter Olympics
People from Marostica
Oath takers at the Olympic Games
Sportspeople from the Province of Vicenza